Daniel Larsen is an American mathematician known for solving a 1994 conjecture of W. R. Alford, Andrew Granville and Carl Pomerance on the distribution of Carmichael numbers, commonly known as Bertrand's postulate for Carmichael numbers.

Childhood and education
Larsen was born in 2004 to two Indiana University Bloomington mathematics professors Michael J. Larsen and Ayelet Lindenstrauss (sister of Elon Lindenstrauss) and grew up in Bloomington, Indiana. He had a strong interest in mathematics as a child, inspired by the mathematician background of both his parents. His father hosted a math circle when he was younger that taught math on the weekend to kids in the neighborhood and Larsen attended despite being only four years old. He also had a strong interest in other projects, learning violin at age 5 and piano at age 6, along with practicing solving larger configurations of Rubik's Cubes and designing his own coin-sorting robot from Lego. He competed in the Scripps National Spelling Bee twice while in middle school, though he never made it to the final round.

While attending Bloomington High School South, he became the youngest accepted contributor to The New York Times crossword puzzle in February 2017 and ended up submitting 11 approved puzzles before his graduation from high school. He applied to and became a finalist in the 2022 Regeneron Science Talent Search for his published research on Carmichael numbers and ultimately won 4th place in the competition, winning $100,000 to pay for his college tuition. In the fall of 2022, he began attending university at the Massachusetts Institute of Technology (MIT).

Career and research
During his teenage years, after watching a documentary about Yitang Zhang, Larsen became interested in number theory and the twin primes conjecture in particular. The subsequent strengthening of Zhang’s method by James Maynard and Terence Tao not long after rekindled his desire to better understand the math involved. He found it too complex at that time, and it wasn't until after reading a paper in February 2021 on Carmichael numbers that he gained insight on the fundamentals of the problem. In November of the same year, Larsen published a paper titled "Bertrand's Postulate for Carmichael Numbers" on the open access repository arXiv that made a more consolidated proof of Maynard and Tao's postulate but involving Carmichael numbers into the twin primes conjecture and attempting to shorten the distance between the numbers per Bertrand's postulate.

He then emailed a copy of the paper to mathematician Andrew Granville and others involved in number theory research. The paper was later published in the journal International Mathematics Research Notices.

References

Living people
21st-century American mathematicians
Number theorists
Mathematicians from Indiana
People from Bloomington, Indiana
2004 births